The Girdle is a mountain range in Sonoma County, California.

References 

Mountain ranges of the San Francisco Bay Area
Mountain ranges of Sonoma County, California
Mountain ranges of Northern California